Barrett's Plantation House is a historic home and bed and breakfast at 203 Old Kings Highway in Mannington Township, New Jersey.

The original portion of the home was built in 1735 which includes a sitting room and dining room on the first floor, two guest rooms — the Dickinson Suite and the Morris Suiteon the second floor and the garret on the third floor. A kitchen was built onto the rear of the original structure in the mid-1800s, then the back section, consisting of a modern kitchen and owner's suite on the upper floor was built in 1991.

See also
List of the oldest buildings in New Jersey
Salem County Insane Asylum
National Register of Historic Places listings in Salem County, New Jersey

References

External links 

Bed and breakfasts in New Jersey
Mannington Township, New Jersey
Houses in Salem County, New Jersey
Houses completed in 1735